Fearghal Purcell is an Irish former sportsperson. He played Gaelic football for the Dublin county team, and was also an Australian rules footballer.

Playing career
Purcell is a former member of the Dublin senior squad. He currently plays for UTS Australian Football Club and represented the Ireland national Australian rules football team, that won the 2011 Australian Football International Cup. He kicked six goals in the tournament, including one goal in the final against Papua New Guinea.

References

1980 births
Living people
Dublin inter-county Gaelic footballers
Gaelic footballers who switched code
Irish players of Australian rules football
Sportspeople from Dublin (city)